Tel Aviv HaShalom railway station is a major railway station on the Ayalon Railway in central Tel Aviv, Israel, serving most lines of Israel Railways. It is located in the median of the Ayalon Highway at the HaShalom interchange, near the city's main commercial area and HaKirya IDF base. In 2019, over 15 million passengers used the station, making it the busiest in the country.

The station was built by the Polish company Mostostal Warszawa and opened in 1996 with two tracks served by two side platforms. One of the platforms was turned into an island platform when a third track was added in 2006. The station building is located above the platforms, with entrances on the north side of HaShalom Road and via a bridge connected to the Azrieli Center mall.

Exit-only stairways were opened in 2008 to provide direct access to bus stops on the southern side of HaShalom Road. In February 2021 Israel Railways completed the construction of a second passenger terminal building located on the southern side of HaShalom road, opposite from the existing passenger building.

Electronic boards display the timetable in the station building, on the platforms, and in the shopping mall. 

Electrification works in the station were completed in 2020. An additional side platform and fourth track are expected to be added to the station in the mid-2020s as part of the project to add a fourth track to the Ayalon Railway.

Access
The station is located near several major crossroads in central Tel Aviv. HaShalom Road continues east toward Givatayim and Ramat Gan while Kaplan Street proceeds west into Tel Aviv. Dozens of bus lines pass along the parallel Begin Road on their way to and from the central bus station.

The buses serving the station area are operated primarily by Egged and Dan, as well as Kavim, Superbus, Afikim and Nateev Express.

Gallery

Train service

Station layout
Platform numbers increase in a West-to-East direction

Ridership

References

Railway stations in Tel Aviv
Railway stations opened in 1996
1996 establishments in Israel